The Lewis–Clark Valley murders refer to a cluster of unsolved murders and disappearances that occurred in the Lewiston-Clarkston metropolitan area of northern Idaho between 1979 and 1982. Law enforcement investigators have identified four victims and possibly a fifth that are connected to a single suspect.

Victims

Christina White

Christina Lee "Chrissy" White, 12, was last seen in Asotin, Washington, on April 28, 1979, at the Asotin County Fair. She called her mother at around 2:30 p.m. from a friend's house to report feeling ill from the heat. Because she did not own a car, her mother was unable to pick her up; instead, she advised Christina to rest, lay down, and apply a moist towel to her neck; then, when she felt better, to return home. Her mother assumed she had gotten better and returned to the fair when she did not phone back.

Between 7:00 and 10:00 p.m., Christina was last seen on the 500 block of 2nd Street. She was not there when her mother arrived to pick her up. When her classmates last saw her, she was reportedly on her way home. Her schoolwork was discovered in pieces at a field outside of Asotin a few weeks after she vanished. Christina was also last seen riding her white ten-speed bicycle at the time of her disappearance. It has never been located.

Kristin David
Senior student at the University of Idaho, Kristin Noel David, 22, was last seen on a bicycle on June 26, 1981, while travelling from Moscow, Idaho, south on U.S. Highway 95 to Lewiston, Idaho. David's dismembered remains were first found on July 4, 1981, six miles west of Clarkston, Washington, and just west of Silcott Island, in and along the Snake River. The following day, some, but not all, of the bones were discovered somewhere down the river. The body parts were wrapped in pages from several local newspaper editions from April 1981, and the remains were hidden inside black plastic bags. Clothing, other personal belongings, and David's blue 10-speed bicycle were never found.

Several people who were travelling on Highway 95 the day David vanished claimed to have seen a woman who matched David's description being approached by a man in a brown vehicle on the west, or southbound, side of the road just outside Genesee, Idaho. According to additional eyewitnesses, the same man approached or interacted with various female cyclists and pedestrians on Highway 95 the same day.

Lewiston Civic Theater incident
Kristina Diane Nelson, 21, and her stepsister Jacqueline Ann “Brandy” Miller, 18, disappeared while walking from Nelson's apartment to a grocery store in downtown Lewiston, Idaho on September 12, 1982. On the same night, Steven R. Pearsall, 35, also went missing from the Lewiston Civic Theater. He asked his friends to drop him off so he could do some laundry washing and clarinet practice. He worked there as a janitor. He has not been seen or heard from since. Uncharacteristically for Pearsall, he left his clarinet at the theatre. He also left an uncashed paycheck at his apartment and his car parked at a friend's house. Pearsall was well-known to both women and had a "big brother"-like relationship with them. They only lived a few blocks away from his apartment, and on their way to the store, they would have passed the theatre and may have even gone inside. Nelson had worked as a janitor at the theatre before quitting, and Pearsall took her position. Pearsall and Nelson had also both attended Lewis-Clark State College.

The remains of Nelson and Miller were found March 19, 1984, in a rural area 35 miles from Lewiston near Kendrick, Idaho. Investigators were unable to determine a cause of death for Nelson, but determined that Miller had been murdered. Pearsall was never located. Investigators initially suspected Pearsall may have been involved in the Nelson-Miller abduction and murders, but later stated that all three had probably been in or near the theater at the time they vanished and were likely victims of the same killer. Authorities believe it is possible Pearsall witnessed their murders and was himself killed as a result.

Suspects and investigation
In 1984, Idaho State Police stated that serial killer Ottis Toole had "implicated himself" in the murder of David and was their "strongest suspect", but added that two other men had also confessed to the same crime. In 2009, a retired Lewiston police detective who had also interviewed Toole stated that he had ruled him out as a suspect.

In 1995, Lewiston police announced that Nelson, Miller, and Pearsall may have been murdered together inside the Lewiston Civic Theater by another theater employee. The suspect, who was present at the theater the night of the trio's disappearance, had also lived in the home from which Christina White disappeared in 1979. In 1998, authorities from Spokane, Washington who were investigating the killings that would later be attributed to Robert Lee Yates interviewed this same suspect. In 1998, Lewiston police stated their belief that Kristin David's murder was linked with the other Lewiston-area murders and disappearances. A 2009 news report stated that David had worked for a time at the Lewiston Civic Theater and may have known the same theater employee suspected in the Nelson-Miller-Pearsall case.

In 2011, a 53-minute documentary examining the case, Confluence, was released which identified the then-unnamed suspect as Lance Jeffrey Voss. During this time the ship docked in ports in California, Washington, Hawaii and Hong Kong. Voss was discharged from the Navy in July 1968 in Alameda, California. According to police reports on June 5, 1972 at around 5:00 a.m., an individual called the police to report a suspicious person outside the Willow Glen Mortuary chapel. Police arrived on the scene to find Voss carrying a flashlight, knife, and camera. A recently removed window screen was found leaning against the building. Voss was arrested and charged with burglary and later reportedly plead guilty to a lesser trespassing offense. Voss never publicly admitted why he was trying to break into the mortuary but there were two recently deceased teenage girls in the mortuary at the time.

The home White visited in Asotin before she vanished belonged to Voss' girlfriend Patricia Brennan. Brennan and Voss married in 1981 and he was present in the house at the time of her disappearance. Voss readily admitted to police that he had seen Christina shortly before she vanished but authorities were unable to determine if White had left the home alone or in the company of Voss. During the search for Christina White, police and family members recalled Voss approaching them and offering to assist in the search. According to reports, at one point in the investigation, he was asked to take a polygraph test – he refused claiming he had retained an attorney who had instructed him to not talk to the police any further. However, police reportedly noted that voice stress analysis conducted on Voss during the questionings, showed “some deception”. In his statement to police, Voss stated that he interacted with Pearsall on the night of the Lewiston Civic Theater incident. He claimed that Pearsall had left the theater around 9:00 p.m. to “go to a party”. Voss said he left the theater shortly thereafter, at 9:30 p.m., to eat dinner at a pizza place. Voss said he returned to the Lewiston Civic Theatre at 10:00 p.m. and laid down on a sofa inside and slept from 10:00 p.m. until 4:00 a.m. the following morning. And even though three people are believed to have entered the theater and disappeared that night, Voss allegedly heard nothing and slept throughout the entire event. In addition, it was reported that through the theater victim Kristin Noel became personally acquainted with Voss. Police reportedly pointed out that Voss’s job at the time as a delivery man, required regular deliveries between Moscow and the known location where Kristen was last seen in Lewiston. However, Voss was never arrested or charged with any crimes related to the Lewiston-Clark murders and his involvement still remains strictly conjecture.

In 2018, a two-part television documentary series examining the case, Cold Valley, aired on the Investigation Discovery network.
An Asotin County police detective who appeared on the program reaffirmed the links police had made earlier between the White and Pearsall disappearances and murders of Nelson and Miller, stating they were likely the work of the same killer. The program also linked suspect Voss with three other cases in and outside the region, including an unsolved Chicago murder from 1963. The body of 8-year-old Diane Taylor was found on August 3, 1963, behind an alley in the Austin neighborhood in Chicago, Illinois, she had been stabbed and slashed, with a stab wound to her heart being the cause of death. Law enforcement believe that Diane was murdered elsewhere and her body dumped in the alley; her autopsy findings lead law enforcement to believe that she had been murdered approximately 36 hours prior to her body being found. Diane Taylor was seen walking around 2:10 p.m. down an alley behind the Austin YMCA. She attended the day camp at the YMCA. Diane had asked a counselor at the YMCA to help her unwrap a lollipop and a friend stated that Diane left walking down the alley behind the YMCA at around 2 p.m. Her murder remains unsolved. Voss was Diane Taylor’s YMCA youth camp counselor and he was one of 750 male students questioned in her murder.

See also
List of fugitives from justice who disappeared
List of solved missing person cases
List of unsolved murders

Notes

External links
 Confluence 2011 documentary film about the murders and disappearances.

1979 in Washington (state)
1979 murders in the United States
1970s missing person cases
1981 in Idaho
1981 murders in the United States
1982 in Idaho
1982 murders in the United States
1980s missing person cases
Female murder victims
Formerly missing people
Fugitives
Lewiston–Clarkston metropolitan area
Missing person cases in Idaho
Missing person cases in Washington (state)
People murdered in Idaho
People murdered in Washington (state)
Serial murders in the United States
Unidentified serial killers
Unsolved murders in the United States